Jenelle Crooks (born 2 July 1994) is an Australian former professional racing cyclist, who rode professionally between 2016 and 2020 for the  and  teams. Crooks has also competed for Australian National Road Series team Specialized Women's Racing and with the Australian National Team for their tour of European races.

Major results

2013
 3rd Criterium, National Under-23 Road Championships
 10th Road race, Oceania Road Championships
2014
 National Under-23 Road Championships
1st  Time trial
2nd Road race
2015
 1st  Young rider classification Thüringen Rundfahrt der Frauen
 Oceania Road Championships
3rd  Under-23 road race
9th Road race
 3rd Time trial, National Under-23 Road Championships
 7th Overall Women's Tour Down Under
 7th Overall La Route de France
1st  Young rider classification
2016
 National Under-23 Road Championships
1st  Road race
3rd Time trial

References

External links
 

1994 births
Living people
Australian female cyclists
Cyclists from Perth, Western Australia